The Maribyrnong River  is a perennial river of the Port Phillip catchment, located in the northwestern suburbs of Melbourne, in the Australian state of Victoria.

Course
The Maribyrnong River draws its headwaters from near Mount Macedon within the Macedon Ranges, part of the Great Dividing Range. The river descends  over its  course.

Headwaters

Various creeks beginning in the southern Mount Macedon area flow into Riddells Creek which in turn flows into the Jackson Creek. The other major tributary of the Maribyrnong is Deep Creek, which also has its headwaters in the northern and eastern parts of the Macedon Ranges. The creek has cut a deep valley through the surrounding basalt plains in its southward course, in particular as it flows through localities such as Konagaderra and Bulla. To the west of Melbourne Airport the tributaries of the Jackson Creek and the Deep Creek conjoin to form the Maribyrnong River. The Organ Pipes National Park can be found adjacent to the Jackson Creek, near the Calder Freeway, with picnic facilities and a prominent display of basaltic columns a geological formation, so named because they look like organ pipes.

Middle reaches

The river flows south and west. At Keilor the river winds back on itself in a giant horseshoe bend, before winding south again at Brimbank Park. Brimbank Park forms a huge amphitheatre in the bend in the river with picnic areas, cycle and walking trails, and a café, that is usually busy on weekends and public holidays. The area is rich in birdlife and native fauna. The Maribyrnong River Trail shared path starts at Brimbank Park, following mostly beside the river to near its conjunction with the Yarra River in Footscray. At Avondale Heights and Essendon West residents have views over the river valley to the skyscrapers of the Melbourne CBD.

Lower reaches

The river flows past Pipemakers Park at Maribyrnong and Melbourne's Living Museum of the West which presents information on the history of the river and the early industrial history of the site. Dolphins are sometimes sighted in the lower reaches of the river, along with many water birds, especially at Burndap Park. Footscray Park opposite the Flemington Racecourse is only metres down river from Pipemakers Park and Burndap Park, the river then meanders across the floodplain to its juncture with the Yarra River at Yarraville.

Geography
The geographic features and tributaries of the river are listed below, tributaries in bold:

Yarraville Wharves
Maribyrnong Berth
Newells Paddock Wetlands
Burndap Lakes
Jacks Canal
Frogs Hollow Wetland
Cliffs
Steele or Rose Creek
Grimes Flat
Kulin Wetlands
Taylors Creek
Horseshoe Bend
Gumms Corner
Arundel Creek
Jackson Creek / Deep Creek

Etymology
The river was initially named Saltwater River by early settlers, due to the tidal nature of its lower reaches. The name Maribyrnong however, is derived from either mirring-gnay-bir-nong which in Woiwurrung, the language of the local Wurundjeri people, is said to mean "I can hear a ringtail possum" or "saltwater river" (Gunung or Gunnung is Woiwurrung for river, as seen in the names of other watercourses in the area, such as; Koonung Creek and Birrarung).

Marriburnong is an alternate spelling listed on a map dated from 1840.

The inner western and north-western suburbs of Melbourne are located in the vicinity of the Maribyrnong River and the river has given its name to the suburb of Maribyrnong and the local government area, the City of Maribyrnong.

History

The Maribyrnong River valley has been home for the Wurundjeri people of the Kulin nation for up to  years. Human remains dated at least yearsold have been found along the river, with much older signs of human habitation also present.

The first Europeans to explore along the river were the party led by Charles Grimes, Deputy Surveyor-General of New South Wales, in February 1803. John Batman is likely to have explored up the river in early 1835. With the establishment of the colony of Melbourne later that year, sheep runs were soon established by Edmund Davis Fergusson and Michael Solomon in the Avondale and Sunshine areas. On Solomon's sheep station the ford now near the west end of Canning Street in Avondale Heights soon became known as Solomon's Ford. This was the lowest crossing on the Saltwater (Maribyrnong) River, and the furthest inland point of tidal influence. Batman is believed to have crossed the river at this point probably in the well worn steps of Aboriginals. It was for many years the only way from Melbourne to Geelong and land west.

During the second half of the 19th century much of Melbourne's industry was located along the river, and the water became very degraded. With the closure of many industries since the 1960s and 1970s, much river front land has opened up to parkland and highly sought after residential estates.

Recreational use

As the second major river in metropolitan Melbourne, the Maribyrnong plays a very important part in Melbourne's recreation. Boating, cycling along its bike paths such as the Maribyrnong River Trail, fishing, and walking. Light bushwalking can also be done and nature watchers can observe Australian native fauna such as echidna, wallabies as well as the ubiquitous possums and flying foxes.

Crossings
Road and rail bridges and other crossing points along the Maribyrnong River include:

Shepherd Bridge – primary arterial road
South Kensington-West Footscray railway
Hopetoun Bridge – primary arterial road
Suburban railway to Footscray
Former stock bridge – relocated from Punt Road, South Yarra
Lynchs Bridge – primary arterial road
Farnsworth Avenue Bridge – secondary arterial road
Pipemakers Park Footbridge
Maribyrnong Road Bridge – primary arterial road
Afton Street Footbridge – pedestrian
Canning Street Bridge (1970) – primary arterial road
Medway Golf Club Footbridge
Solomons Ford – historic crossing point
Maribyrnong River Viaduct, on the Albion-Jacana railway
E.J. Whitten Bridge – Western Ring Road
Ford
Ford
Old Calder Highway Bridge – primary arterial road
Historic Calder Bridge (1868)
Calder Freeway Bridge
Flora Street Bridge – local road and private access
Historic Arundel Road Bridge – (built 1906-7, closed to vehicles 1989, closed to pedestrians 2007)
Arundel Road Bridge (1989) – local road

Flora and fauna

Native species
Many native species exist along the Maribyrnong River with many species thriving in the area. Native mammals include swamp wallabies, grey-headed flying foxes, common brushtail possums, common ringtail possums, water rats, echidnas, and platypus in the upper reaches of the river. Native reptile species include eastern brown snakes, tiger snakes, skinks, and common snakeneck turtles. Native birds include the eastern whipbird, cockatoo, rainbow lorikeet, galah, brown falcon, peregrine falcon, square-tailed kite, royal spoonbill, black swan, Pacific black duck, little pied cormorant, moorhen, and long-billed corella. There are various native frogs and native fish species include the short-finned eel, tupong, short-headed lamprey, Australian grayling, southern black bream, common galaxias, broad-finned galaxias and spotted galaxias. Starfish may also be found in the river.

Introduced species
Introduced species include the red fox, European rabbit, and feral cat. While introduced birds include the song thrush, common blackbird, wild chantelle, common angie, common myna, common starling, house sparrow, spotted turtle dove, rock pigeon, and mallard. Common carp have also been introduced to the river.

Environmental issues
The Maribyrnong River faces various environmental issues, apart from introduced pest species, also pollution and contamination – arsenic and heavy metals from industry and litter including one trap to mitigate litter entering the river from stormwater

See also

 Afton Street Conservation Reserve
 
 Maribyrnong River Trail

References

External links
Friends of the Maribyrnong Valley
  Parks Victoria Brimbank Park page Sept 2007
  Maribyrnong River Parks Victoria page Sept 2007
  Maribyrnong Valley Parklands – See Parknotes

Melbourne Water catchment
Rivers of Greater Melbourne (region)
 
Tributaries of the Yarra River
City of Melbourne
City of Maribyrnong
City of Moonee Valley
City of Brimbank
City of Hume